Craig G. Rogers (born May 26, 1971), is an American urologist and the Chair of Urology Vattikuti Urology Institute at the Henry Ford Hospital in Detroit, Michigan. Rogers is known for pioneering minimally invasive robotic kidney surgeries using da Vinci Surgical System including single incision robotic surgeries. He was the first surgeon to utilize ultrasound probe in robotic kidney surgery. On February 9, 2009 he performed the first twittered live robotic surgery.

Education and career
Rogers is a graduate of Stanford Medical School. He completed residency at Brady Urological Institute at the Johns Hopkins Hospital as a chief resident. He was trained by Patrick C. Walsh.

Awards and achievements
first nanoknife kidney surgery in Michigan
first clinical study of barbed suture for Robotic-assisted partial nephrectomy 2011 
winner of European Robotic Urology Symposium Video Contest 2008, 2009, 2010, 2011 
winner of AUA Northcentral Section Annual Meeting Video Contest 2010
performed first single-incision robotic nephrectomy in state of Michigan 8/08 
performed first robotic retroperitoneal renal cryoablation procedure 2008 
performed first live "Twittered" robotic kidney surgery with coverage on CNN 2009
performed first robot assisted kidney surgery with ultrasound probe 
performed first live webcast of robotic partial nephrectomy (OR Live) 12/6/07

Educational activity
Rogers has been serving as a director and instructor of multiple courses on kidney robotic surgeries, including International Robotic Urology Symposium in Las Vegas, Nevada, European Robotic Urology Symposium and annual Advanced Robotic Renal Surgery Workshops in Detroit.

See also
Vattikuti Urology Institute
Robotic Surgery

References

External links 
 Craig G. Rogers' website

1971 births
Living people
American urologists